'Crusaders for Real Hip-Hop was a short-lived New Jersey hip-hop trio that was composed of producer Tony D, Mr. Law & Rahzii Hi-Power. The group released one album on Profile Records in 1992 called Deja Vu, It's ’82.

Discography

Albums
1992: Deja Vu, It's ’82 (Profile Records)

External links

 Crusaders For Real Hip at Discogs

References

American hip hop groups
American musical trios
Profile Records artists